Redford is a census-designated place (CDP) in Presidio County, Texas, United States. The population was 90 at the 2010 census.

Geography
Redford is located at  (29.448607, -104.187633).

The CDP lost area prior to the 2010 census, dropping it down to  all land.

Climate
This area has a large amount of sunshine year round due to its stable descending air and high pressure.  According to the Köppen Climate Classification system, Redford has a desert climate, abbreviated "Bwh" on climate maps.

Demographics
As of the census of 2000, there were 132 people, 48 households, and 36 families residing in the CDP. The population density was 2.9 people per square mile (1.1/km2). There were 74 housing units at an average density of 1.6/sq mi (0.6/km2). The racial makeup of the CDP was 87.88% White, 0.76% Native American, 0.76% Asian, 10.61% from other races. Hispanic or Latino of any race were 87.88% of the population.

There were 48 households, of which 39.6% had children under the age of 18 living with them, 60.4% were married couples living together, 14.6% had a female householder with no husband present, and 25.0% were non-families. 18.8% of all households were made up of individuals, and 16.7% had someone living alone who was 65 years of age or older. The average household size was 2.75 and the average family size was 3.25.

In the CDP, the age distribution of the population shows 31.8% under the age of 18, 6.1% from 18 to 24, 15.9% from 25 to 44, 22.0% from 45 to 64, and 24.2% who were 65 years of age or older. The median age was 42 years. For every 100 females, there were 85.9 males. For every 100 females age 18 and over, there were 83.7 males.

The median income for a household in the CDP was $15,417, and the median income for a family was $15,903. Males had a median income of $16,250 versus $7,031 for females. The per capita income for the CDP was $3,577. There were 65.7% of families and 83.8% of the population living below the poverty line, including 100.0% of those under 18 and 37.0% of those over 64.

Education
Redford is served by the Marfa Independent School District.

Presidio County is within the Odessa College District.

References

Census-designated places in Presidio County, Texas
Census-designated places in Texas
Texas populated places on the Rio Grande